High on the Hog is the ninth studio album by Canadian-American rock group the Band, released in 1996. As with its predecessor, 1993's Jericho, it relies heavily on cover versions; only two tracks are original. Songs include Bob Dylan's "Forever Young" (which was intended as a tribute to Jerry Garcia), a live recording of Richard Manuel (who had died ten years prior) performing "She Knows", and the closer "Ramble Jungle" (which features vocals by Champion Jack Dupree).

Track listing

The European and Japanese pressings of the album included a bonus track, "Young Blood", which only appeared in the US on a tribute album to Doc Pomus and which is the only release by the group to include vocals by multi-instrumentalist Garth Hudson. A 2006 CD release on the U.S. label Titan/Pyramid Records includes two bonus tracks, the first of which is "Young Blood"; the other is the Sam Cooke cover "Chain Gang", which was previously unreleased.

Personnel
The Band
Rick Danko – acoustic and electric bass, acoustic guitar, vocals
Levon Helm – drums, bass guitar, harmonica, vocals
Garth Hudson – keyboards, soprano, alto, tenor, baritone and bass saxophone, accordion, organ, trumpet, vocals on bonus track "Young Blood"
Richard Manuel – piano and vocals on "She Knows"
Jim Weider – guitars, bass guitar
Randy Ciarlante – drums, percussion, vocals
Richard Bell – piano, keyboards, keyboard bass, horns

Additional personnel
Tom Malone – trombone, trumpet and baritone saxophone on "Stand Up", "Free Your Mind" and "Ramble Jungle"
Ron Finck – tenor saxophone and flute on "Stand Up", "Free Your Mind" and "Ramble Jungle"
Howard Johnson – baritone saxophone on "Stand Up" and "Free Your Mind"
Blondie Chaplin – acoustic guitar and vocals on "Crazy Mama" and "I Must Love You Too Much"
Colin Linden – acoustic guitar on "Forever Young"
Larry Packer – violin and viola on "She Knows"
Frank Luther – string bass on "She Knows"
Jason Myles – harp emulation and programming on "She Knows"
Champion Jack Dupree – vocals on "Ramble Jungle"
Kenn Lending – guitar on "Ramble Jungle"
Rob Leon – bass guitar on "Ramble Jungle"
Maud Hudson – backing vocals on "I Must Love You Too Much"
Marie Spinosa – backing vocals on "I Must Love You Too Much"
Ian Kimmett – backing vocals on "I Must Love You Too Much"
Horns arranged by Garth Hudson, Richard Bell, Levon Helm, Aaron Hurwitz and Tom Malone
Co-produced and engineered by Aaron "Professor Louie" Hurwitz

References

1996 albums
Albums produced by Garth Hudson
Covers albums
Rhino Records albums
The Band albums